Nordic cross skating is also called Nordic inline skating or Off-road skating or Cross-country skating or Nordic blading. This sport activity (similar to roller skiing) combines snow cross-country skiing and inline skating. Typically uses specialized inline skates with two big all-terrain wheels (4-6 inch diameter, typically pneumatic) and special poles that the skater pumps like ski poles to make the skates go faster and provides a good workout for the majority of the major muscle groups, including upper body. Nordic skaters use a technique similar to the technique that cross-country skiers and inline skaters use. Nordic cross skating popularity is growing because of the range of fitness benefits.

See also 

 Roller skiing#Nordic blading

References

Skating